Berhane Habtemariam (Tigrinya: በርሃነ ሀብተማርአም) is Eritrean politician. He has been Minister of Finance of Eritrea since 2014. He was the first Auditor-General of Eritrea. He was trained as an accountant in the United Kingdom.

In January 2007 he was awarded a special commendation for promoting ethics and professionalism in his capacity as Auditor-General. He was the first African to receive this award.

References

Eritrean politicians
Living people
Finance ministers of Eritrea
Government audit officials
Auditors
Government ministers of Eritrea
Year of birth missing (living people)
Place of birth missing (living people)